Martin Rowson (born 15 February 1959) is a British editorial cartoonist and writer. His genre is political satire and his style is scathing and graphic. He characterises his work as "visual journalism". His cartoons appear frequently in The Guardian and the Daily Mirror. He also contributes freelance cartoons to other publications, such as Tribune, Index on Censorship and the Morning Star. He is chair of the British Cartoonists' Association.

Early life
Rowson was adopted as a child, and educated at the independent Merchant Taylors' School in Northwood in north-west London, followed by Pembroke College, Cambridge, where he read English Literature.

Career

Rowson's books include graphic adaptations of The Waste Land and Tristram Shandy. Snatches, his novel, was published in 2006. It is a comic journey through history, focusing on the "stories of the worst decisions the human race has ever made". Stuff (2007), his next novel, is part autobiography, part history of his family and upbringing. He also drew original cartoons for the title sequence of the film Pride and Prejudice and Zombies.

In 2008 he published The Dog Allusion: Gods, Pets and How to Be Human, arguing that religion is a complete waste of time and money — much like keeping pets. (The title is itself an allusion to the Richard Dawkins book The God Delusion.) In 2014 'The Coalition Book' containing a collection of cartoons, and a written account, of the four years of the coalition government was published by Self Made Hero. He is an Honorary Associate of the National Secular Society and a distinguished supporter and board member of Humanists UK.

Rowson was appointed 'Cartoonist Laureate' of London when Ken Livingstone was Mayor, and his cartoons appeared in the Mayor's newsletter, The Londoner. In 2006 he was awarded an Honorary Doctorate in Journalism from the University of Westminster. In 2014 he was appointed to an Honorary Fellowship by Goldsmiths, University of London.

On 15 September 2010, Rowson, along with 54 other public figures, signed an open letter published in The Guardian, stating his opposition to Pope Benedict XVI's state visit to the UK.

In June 2013, Rowson became the fifth trustee for People's Trust for Endangered Species (PTES), a wildlife conservation charity based in Battersea, south-west London.

Personal life
Rowson is married and has two children. Who's Who lists his interests as "cooking, drinking, ranting, atheism, zoos, collecting taxidermy". He is a supporter and trustee of the Zoological Society of London (ZSL), having taken an active role in the campaign to cancel plans to close the organization’s London Zoo in 1991, and since serving multiple terms on its governing council.

Political views
In December 2019, along with 42 other leading cultural figures, Rowson signed a letter endorsing the Labour Party under Jeremy Corbyn's leadership in the 2019 general election. The letter stated that "Labour's election manifesto under Jeremy Corbyn's leadership offers a transformative plan that prioritises the needs of people and the planet over private profit and the vested interests of a few."

Bibliography
 
 
 
 
 
 
 
 
 
 
 
 
 
Rowson, Martin. The Communist Manifesto.

References

External links
Martin Rowson cartoons at The Guardian
Interview alongside Steve Bell
Cartoonist Laureate page at the Mayor of London's website
Biography of Rowson from the British Cartoon Archive, University of Kent
Rowson on Hogarth – a video presented by Martin Rowson at Tate's website.

1959 births
Alumni of Pembroke College, Cambridge
British editorial cartoonists
British cartoonists
English atheists
Living people
People educated at Merchant Taylors' School, Northwood
English humanists
English writers
British secularists